The 2016 European Qualification Tournament for Rio Olympic Games was held in Istanbul, Turkey from January 16 to January 17, 2016. Each country may enter maximum 2 male and 2 female divisions with only one in each division and the first two ranked athletes per weight division qualify their NOCs a place each for Olympic Games.

Medalists

Men

Women

Qualification summary

Results

Men

−58 kg
16 January

−68 kg
16 January

−80 kg
17 January

+80 kg
17 January

Women

−49 kg
17 January

−57 kg
17 January

−67 kg
16 January

+67 kg
16 January

References

External links
 World Taekwondo Federation

Olympic Qualification
Taekwondo Olympic Qual
2016 in Turkish sport
Taekwondo qualification for the 2016 Summer Olympics